Philippine Advertising Congress was an annual gathering of Philippine broadcast CEOs, advertisers, and personalities in the Philippines.

External links
Philippine Ad Congress official website

Advertising organizations
Advertising in the Philippines
Business organizations based in the Philippines